Romana Dubnova (born 4 November 1978) is a Czech athlete high jumper. She competed at the 2008 Summer Olympics.

Competition record

References 

1978 births
Living people
Czech female high jumpers
Athletes (track and field) at the 2008 Summer Olympics
Olympic athletes of the Czech Republic